Akseli Kalermo (born 17 March 1997) is a Finnish professional footballer who plays for Lithuanian club FK Riteriai, as a defender.

Career

As a youth player, Kalermo joined the youth academy of Atalanta.

Kalermo signed with Brattvåg IL for the 2019 season.

In June 2020 he moved to Lithuanian club FK Riteriai.

References

1997 births
Living people
Finnish footballers
AC Oulu players
Atalanta B.C. players
Rovaniemen Palloseura players
FC Santa Claus players
Vaasan Palloseura players
Brattvåg IL players
Veikkausliiga players
Ykkönen players
Kakkonen players
Norwegian Second Division players
Association football defenders
Finnish expatriate footballers
Finnish expatriate sportspeople in Italy
Expatriate footballers in Italy
AC Kajaani players
FK Riteriai players
A Lyga players
Finnish expatriate sportspeople in Norway
Expatriate footballers in Norway
Finnish expatriate sportspeople in Lithuania
Expatriate footballers in Lithuania
People from Kannus
Sportspeople from Central Ostrobothnia